Luciano Asley Rocha Carlos (born June 19, 1977) is a former Brazilian football player.

Playing career
Luciano joined J2 League club Oita Trinita as Valdney successor in May 2000. He played many matches as regular midfielder. In July 2000, he moved to J2 club Sagan Tosu. He played until end of 2000 season and scored many goals. In August 2001, he rejoined Trinita. However he could not play many matches and left the club end of 2001 season.

Club statistics

References

External links

ocn.ne.jp

1977 births
Living people
Brazilian footballers
J2 League players
Oita Trinita players
Sagan Tosu players
Brazilian expatriate footballers
Expatriate footballers in Japan
Association football midfielders